The men's team sabre was one of eight fencing events on the fencing at the 1976 Summer Olympics programme. It was the fifteenth appearance of the event. The competition was held from July 26 to 27, 1976. 63 fencers from 14 nations competed.

Rosters

Results

Round 1

Round 1 Pool A 

France and the Soviet Union each defeated Bulgaria, 11–5. The two victors then faced off. The Soviet Union won 9–1.

Round 1 Pool B 

The United States and Italy each defeated Canada, 9–7 and 13–3, respectively. The two victors then faced off. Italy won 9–3.

Round 1 Pool C 

The first two rounds of matches left Romania and Cuba at 2–0 apiece (advancing to the knockout rounds) and Great Britain and Thailand at 0–2 each (eliminating them). Romania defeated Cuba 9–3 to take the top spot in the group. Great Britain and Thailand did not face each other.

Round 1 Pool D 

The first two rounds of matches left Hungary and Poland at 2–0 apiece (advancing to the knockout rounds) and Argentina and Iran at 0–2 each (eliminating them). Hungary defeated Poland 8–6 (with a 58–46 touches advantage making the final two bouts unnecessary) to take the top spot in the group. Argentina defeated Iran 9–4 for third place.

Elimination rounds

References

Fencing at the 1976 Summer Olympics
Men's events at the 1976 Summer Olympics